Stein Kuhnle (born 22 November 1947) is a Norwegian political scientist.

He was born in Bergen, a son of Jacob R. Kuhnle. He was appointed professor of comparative politics at the University of Bergen in 1982. Among his works is Velferdsstaten from 1985, and in 1995 he was co-editor of a book on the theory of political scientist Stein Rokkan. He is a fellow of the Norwegian Academy of Science and Letters.

References

1947 births
Living people
Norwegian political scientists
Academic staff of the University of Bergen
Members of the Norwegian Academy of Science and Letters